Rascals is a 1938 American comedy film directed by H. Bruce Humberstone and written by Robert Ellis and Helen Logan. The film stars Jane Withers, Rochelle Hudson, Robert Wilcox, Borrah Minevitch, Steffi Duna and Katharine Alexander. The film was released on May 20, 1938, by 20th Century Fox.

Plot

A group of Gypsy thieves with Robin Hood-like morals take in an amnesiac socialite named Margaret Adams. They try to raise money to cover an operation to restore Adams's memories.

Cast     
Jane Withers as Gypsy
Rochelle Hudson as Margaret Adams
Robert Wilcox as Tony
Borrah Minevitch as Gino
Steffi Duna as Stella
Katharine Alexander as Mrs. Agatha Adams
Chester Clute as Mr. Roger Adams
José Crespo as Baron Von Brun
Paul Stanton as Dr. Cecil Carter
Frank Reicher as Dr. C.M. Garvey
Edward Cooper as Grayson 
Kathleen Burke as Dr. Carter's Nurse
Myra Marsh as Hospital Nurse
Frank Puglia as Florist
Robert Gleckler as Police Lieutenant
Eddie Dunn as Dugan
Howard Hickman as Judge
The Harmonica Rascals as Themselves

References

External links 
 

1938 films
1930s English-language films
20th Century Fox films
American comedy films
1938 comedy films
Films directed by H. Bruce Humberstone
American black-and-white films
Films about Romani people
1930s American films